Nockamixon Township is a township in Bucks County, Pennsylvania, United States. The population was 3,441 at the 2010 census.

Geography
According to the United States Census Bureau, the township has a total area of 22.6 square miles (58.5 km), of which 22.2 square miles (57.5 km)  is land and 0.4 square mile (1.0 km)  (1.73%) is water. It is drained by the Delaware River, which separates it from New Jersey. The township's villages include Bucksville, Fehrtown, Ferndale, Frogtown, Harrow, Kintnersville (also in Durham Township), and Revere.

Natural features include Beaver Creek, Cauffman Hill, Gallows Hill, Gallows Run, Haycock Creek, Lake Warren, Narrows Creek, The Narrows, and Tinicum Creek.

Neighboring municipalities
Durham Township (northwest)
Springfield Township (west)
Haycock Township (southwest)
Bedminster Township (south)
Tinicum Township (southeast)
Bridgeton Township (northeast)
Holland Township, New Jersey (north)

Demographics

As of the 2010 census, the township was 96.2% White, 0.3% Black or African American, 0.1% Native American, 0.3% Asian, and 1.4% were two or more races. 1.7% of the population were of Hispanic or Latino ancestry.

As of the census of 2000, there were 3,517 people, 1,337 households, and 989 families residing in the township.  The population density was 158.5 people per square mile (61.2/km).  There were 1,411 housing units at an average density of 63.6/sq mi (24.6/km).  The racial makeup of the township was 98.29% White, 0.51% African American, 0.03% Native American, 0.11% Asian, 0.11% Pacific Islander, 0.14% from other races, and 0.80% from two or more races. Hispanic or Latino of any race were 0.60% of the population.

There were 1,337 households, out of which 31.1% had children under the age of 18 living with them, 62.5% were married couples living together, 7.4% had a female householder with no husband present, and 26.0% were non-families. 18.8% of all households were made up of individuals, and 5.5% had someone living alone who was 65 years of age or older.  The average household size was 2.63 and the average family size was 3.04.

In the township the population was spread out, with 23.5% under the age of 18, 7.3% from 18 to 24, 29.7% from 25 to 44, 29.9% from 45 to 64, and 9.6% who were 65 years of age or older.  The median age was 40 years. For every 100 females, there were 105.8 males.  For every 100 females age 18 and over, there were 105.2 males.

The median income for a household in the township was $60,231, and the median income for a family was $66,250. Males had a median income of $45,511 versus $32,446 for females. The per capita income for the township was $26,145.  About 1.0% of families and 4.0% of the population were below the poverty line, including 5.0% of those under age 18 and 7.5% of those age 65 or over. Nockamixon township is patrolled by the Pennsylvania State Police, Dublin Barracks.

Climate

According to the Köppen climate classification system, Nockamixon Township, Pennsylvania has a hot-summer, wet all year, humid continental climate (Dfa). Dfa climates are characterized by at least one month having an average mean temperature ≤ 32.0 °F (≤ 0.0 °C), at least four months with an average mean temperature ≥ 50.0 °F (≥ 10.0 °C), at least one month with an average mean temperature ≥ 71.6 °F (≥ 22.0 °C), and no significant precipitation difference between seasons. During the summer months, episodes of extreme heat and humidity can occur with heat index values ≥ 100 °F (≥ 38 °C). On average, the wettest month of the year is July which corresponds with the annual peak in thunderstorm activity. During the winter months, episodes of extreme cold and wind can occur with wind chill values < 0 °F (< -18 °C). The plant hardiness zone is 6b with an average annual extreme minimum air temperature of -2.9 °F (-19.4 °C). The average seasonal (Nov-Apr) snowfall total is between 30 and 36 inches (76 and 91 cm), and the average snowiest month is February which corresponds with the annual peak in nor'easter activity.

Transportation

Numbered highways traversing Nockamixon Township include Pennsylvania Route 32, Pennsylvania Route 412, Pennsylvania Route 563 and Pennsylvania Route 611. PA 611 utilizes Easton Road on a north-south alignment through the heart of the township. PA 32 follows River Road eastward from PA 611 adjacent to the Delaware River across the northern portion of the township. PA 412 utilizes Durham Road heading northwestward from PA 611 across southwestern portions of the township. Finally, PA 563 follows Mountain View Drive southwestward from PA 412 across the southwestern part of the township.

Ecology

According to the A. W. Kuchler U.S. potential natural vegetation types, Nockamixon Township, Pennsylvania would have an Appalachian Oak (104) vegetation type with an Eastern Hardwood Forest (25) vegetation form.

References

External links

Nockamixon Township

Townships in Bucks County, Pennsylvania
Townships in Pennsylvania